Beshkent is a village in the Batken Region of Kyrgyzstan. It is part of the Leylek District. Its population was 4,474 in 2021.

References

Populated places in Batken Region